Stan Sanders (born Stanley Cocciolone on August 12, 1939) is an American former baseball player and coach.  He served as the head baseball coach at the University of Toledo from 1970 to 1981 and again from 1983 to 1992, compiling a record of 534–447.  He spent 1982 as a scout for the New York Yankees of Major League Baseball.

Sanders was born on August 12, 1939 in Philadelphia, Pennsylvania and attended high school in Miami, Florida, where he was a childhood friend of Skip Bertman.

References

External links

1939 births
Living people
Elmira Pioneers players
Johnson City Phillies players
Miami Dade Sharks baseball coaches
Miami Hurricanes baseball coaches
New York Yankees scouts
Ohio Bobcats baseball coaches
Toledo Rockets baseball coaches
Sports coaches from Miami
Baseball players from Miami
Baseball players from Philadelphia